Dhrupad Mela is an annual music festival held in Varanasi, India. It features performances in the dhrupad tradition of Indian classical music.

References  

Hindustani classical music festivals
Culture of Varanasi